Praxis marmarinopa, the western praxis, is a moth of the family Noctuidae. The species was first described by Edward Meyrick in 1897. It is found in Australia.

References

Catocalinae